Alexander Macdonald, 1st Baron Macdonald (c. 1745 – 12 September 1795), was a Scottish nobleman and Chief of Clan MacDonald of Sleat.

Macdonald was the younger son of Sir Alexander Macdonald, 7th Baronet, and his wife Lady Margaret (née Montgomerie). He was educated at Eton and served with the Grenadier Guards. Macdonald was also a deputy lieutenant of Inverness-shire and a brigadier-general in the Royal Company of Archers. He succeeded his elder brother in the baronetcy in 1766 and in 1776 he was raised to the Peerage of Ireland as Baron Macdonald, of Slate in the County of Antrim.

In 1768 Lord Macdonald married Elizabeth Diana Bosville, eldest daughter of Godfrey Bosville IV of Gunthwaite and of Thorpe Hall, Rudston, both in Yorkshire, and sister of the ardent Whig Colonel William Bosville (1745–1813). They had seven sons and three daughters. Lady Macdonald died in 1789. Lord Macdonald survived her by six years and died in September 1795. He was succeeded in his titles by his son Alexander Macdonald, 2nd Baron Macdonald.

Notes

References

Kidd, Charles, Williamson, David (editors). Debrett's Peerage and Baronetage (1990 edition). New York: St Martin's Press, 1990.

1740s births
1795 deaths
Peers of Ireland created by George III
Deputy Lieutenants of Inverness-shire
Grenadier Guards officers
People educated at Eton College
Year of birth uncertain
Members of the Royal Company of Archers
Sleat, Alexander Macdonald, 6th Lord
1